This is a list of support ships of the Royal Navy of the United Kingdom. There are currently no active ships. In World War I, obsolete hulks and cruisers were generally used for maintenance and support. Many commercial vessels were taken up from trade during both wars to act as depot ships. The first ship built specifically for the role was the Medway of 1928. Converted ships below are given with dates of conversion.

Ships

  – converted in 1901 into the world's first submarine depot ship
  (1915) – converted from Brocklebank Line steamship Manipur (1906). Variously described as destroyer depot ship and fleet repair ship
  – submarine depot ship
  – fleet repair ship
  – destroyer depot ship
  (1922) – prison ship
 s
 
 
 s
 
 
  – submarine depot ship
  (1940) – ex-training cruiser, destroyer depot ship 
  (1943) – fleet aircraft maintenance carrier
  (1944) – ex-minelayer, landing craft repair ship
 UK merchant ship conversions
 Hull repair type
 Beauly Firth (1945)
 Dullisk Cove (1944)
 Mullion Sound (1945)
 Solway Firth (1944)
 Aircraft component repair type
 Cuillin Sound (1945)
 Holm Sound (1944)
 Moray Firth (1945)
 Canadian merchant ship conversions
 Escort repair type
  (1945)
 Berry Head (1945)
 Duncansby Head (1945)
  (1945)
 Mull of Galloway (1945) 
 Rame Head (1945)
 Landing craft repair type (Beachy Head class)
 Buchan Ness (1945)
 Dungeness (1945)
 Fife Ness (1945)
  (1945) – Sea Slug missile trials ship 1956
 Dodman Point (1945)
 Hartland Point (1945)
 Spurn Point (1945)
 Coastal forces repair type
 Cape Wrath (1946)
 Armaments repair type
 Portland Bill (1945)
  ex-light fleet carriers
  (1944) – fleet aircraft maintenance ship
  (1944) – fleet aircraft maintenance ship
  (1964) – fleet repair ship
  (1984) – seabed operations ship

See also
List of Royal Fleet Auxiliary ship names

Support
Royal Navy support